Malgassochaetus descarpentriesi is a species of beetles in the family Chaetosomatidae. It is found in Madagascar.

References 

 

Chaetosomatidae
Beetles described in 1980
Insects of Madagascar
Endemic fauna of Madagascar